"Cheer Up" (stylized in all caps) is a song recorded by South Korean girl group Twice. It was released by JYP Entertainment on April 25, 2016, as the lead single from their second extended play Page Two. It was written and composed by Sam Lewis and Black Eyed Pilseung respectively.

A major commercial success, the song topped the Gaon Digital Chart and is the best-performing single of 2016 in South Korea. It also won several awards including Song of the Year in two major music awards shows, Melon Music Awards and Mnet Asian Music Awards.

Composition

"Cheer Up" has lyrics written by Sam Lewis and music by Black Eyed Pilseung, the same team who wrote Twice's hit single "Like Ooh-Ahh" from their debut EP. It is a dance-pop song that incorporates multiple genres, including hip hop, tropical house, and drum and bass; this blend was described as "color pop". Lyrically, the song emotes tease and frustration about a love interest.

Music video
The music video for "Cheer Up" was directed by video production team Naive (Kim Young-jo and Yoo Seung-woo). The music video was released on JYP Entertainment's YouTube Channel. It went viral on YouTube soon after it was uploaded on April 25, 2016, gaining 400,000 views in only thirty minutes. It reached one million views in less than a day, and surpassed seven million views on April 27.

In the music video, the members portray characters from famous films and TV shows. Mina is Itsuki Fujii from Love Letter, Sana is Sailor Moon from the Sailor Moon series, Nayeon is Sidney Prescott from the Scream film series, Tzuyu is Holly Golightly from Breakfast at Tiffany's, and Jeongyeon is Faye from Chungking Express. Momo is an action heroine reminiscent of the Tomb Raider and Resident Evil film series, Jihyo is a cheerleader from Bring It On, Chaeyoung is a cowgirl (reminiscent of different Western films, especially A Fistful of Dollars), and Dahyun is the gisaeng Hwang Jini (from the biopic Hwang Jin Yi). In the group dance scenes, the members are cheerleaders at a pep rally in a soccer stadium and a basketball stadium and in another dance scene, they are in front of a house, decorated as if hosting a party, wearing casual clothing.

A special music video, titled "Twice Avengers", was released on May 27 to commemorate the original music video reaching 35 million views on YouTube. In the special video, the members dance in their film character costumes on a set made to look like a planet in outer space.

On November 17, the video surpassed 100 million views. It then surpassed 200 million views on August 9, 2017, making Twice the first K-pop girl group with two music videos to reach this milestone. The music video also topped 2016 YouTube's Most Popular Music Video in South Korea.

Reception

Critical 

Tamar Herman of Billboard described "Cheer Up" as an atypical K-pop girl group release that "solidifies Twice's unique style" through its unexpected mix of beats and genres. She further noted that the accompanying music video helped reinforce the members' independent identities while the song showcased of each member's individual voice, "[forgoing] musical wholeness for the sake of eccentricity".

Fuse journalists Jason Lipshutz, Tina Xu, and Jeff Benjamin discussed the release in the K-pop-centric podcast K-Stop, describing "Cheer Up" as a 1990s pop throwback reminiscent of Britney Spears' "...Baby One More Time". They praised the single's fun and catchy tone, rap break, and the "incredible" production quality of its music video but criticized its processed vocals and controversial lyrics, which seem to encourage young women to "play games" (i.e., feign disinterest) with their romantic partners. They concluded that, while the group has a lot of potential, they would need to "polish it up" for future releases.

Billboard and Dazed included "Cheer Up" in their best K-pop songs of 2016 lists.

The song's "shy shy shy" line became a viral meme and was imitated by many celebrities.

Commercial performance
"Cheer Up" was a commercial success, debuting atop the Gaon Digital Chart. It topped the chart for three non-consecutive weeks. The song acculumated 1,839,566 digital sales and 111,556,482 streams in 2016, making it the best performing single of the year. Elsewhere, it entered Billboard'''s World Digital Song Sales at number three.

"Cheer Up" surpassed 2,500,000 downloads in August 2017 on Gaon Music Chart. As of 2018, it has 2,737,015 digital downloads and 160 million streams.

Japanese version
On February 24, 2017, Twice officially announced that their debut in Japan was set for June 28. They released a compilation album titled #Twice'' which consists of ten songs including both Korean and Japanese-language versions of "Cheer Up". The Japanese lyrics were written by Yu Shimoji.

Accolades

Charts

Weekly charts

Year-end charts

Certifications

! scope="col" colspan="3" | Streaming
|-

See also
List of Gaon Digital Chart number ones of 2016

References

 

2016 singles
2016 songs
Korean-language songs
JYP Entertainment singles
Gaon Digital Chart number-one singles
Twice (group) songs